Weslaco  is a city in Hidalgo County, Texas, United States. As of the 2020 census the population was 41,103, and in 2020 the estimated population was 41,103. It is located at the southern tip of Texas in the Rio Grande Valley near the  Mexican border, across the Rio Grande from the city of Nuevo Progreso, Rio Bravo, Tamaulipas.

Weslaco derives its name from the W.E. Stewart Land Company. It was the hometown of Harlon Block, one of the Marines photographed raising the flag at Iwo Jima, and of film and television actor David Spielberg.

Streets north of the railroad tracks have Spanish names, and streets south of the railroad tracks bear names in English, as a consequence of a 1921 municipal ordinance which declared that land north of the tracks be reserved for Hispanic residences and businesses, and land south of the tracks be reserved for "Anglo" residences and businesses. During World War II, sandbag production reached a peak in Weslaco, and the town declared itself the "sandbagging capital of the world".

Weslaco is part of the McAllen–Edinburg–Mission and Reynosa–McAllen metropolitan areas.

History

The present location of Weslaco was originally part of the Llano Grande Land Grant granted to Juan José Ynojosa de Ballí in 1790. After Ynojosa's death, the grant was allocated to his children. Manuela and María received the land on which Weslaco is located today. The Ballí family ranched and maintained ownership of the land until 1852. In 1904, the Hidalgo and San Miguel extension of the St. Louis, Brownsville and Mexico Railway made its way to the site. It was promoted by Uriah Lott, Lon C. Hill, Jr., and others interested in developing the area through farming as opposed to ranching. The American Rio Grande Land and Irrigation Company of neighboring Mercedes purchased a major portion of the Llano Grande grant and platted the West Tract in 1913. In an effort to control raids from Mexico, the United States government stationed troops along the Rio Grande in 1916. A camp was established at the Llano Grande railroad depot. This camp was located between Mercedes and the current site of Weslaco. A watchtower was constructed at Progreso by these troops.

On December 14, 1917, the irrigation company sold  at ninety dollars an acre to the W. E. Stewart Land Company. The town name "Weslaco" was derived from the company's name. The Stewart Company later sold the townsite to Ed C. Couch, Dan R. Couch, R. C. Couch, and R. L. Reeves. The site was surveyed and platted on September 18, 1919, by H. E. Bennett, a civil engineer hired by Ed Couch and R. L. Reeves, whose partners, fearing failure, had backed out of the venture. Nearby communities circulated flyers discouraging settlement at the proposed town. Nevertheless, the sale of lots was held on December 8–10, 1919. Prices ranged from $50 to $400 per lot. To make a claim, individuals had to choose a lot and camp on it until the day of the sale. Lots were given away free to church groups. Three cars were also given away as a promotion during the sale.

In 1941 stamp collector Oliver Rumbel and Weslaco Postmaster Davenport discovered at the Weslaco post office 26 panes (totalling 1,300 stamps) of the 1938 6 cent eagle airmail stamp printed in ultramarine and carmine rather than dark blue and carmine.  This color error is recognized by the Scott catalog as C23c.  No other examples of this color error were ever reported.

Geography

Weslaco is located in southeastern Hidalgo County at  (26.159130, –97.987374). It is bordered to the east by the city of Mercedes and to the west by the city of Donna. Interstate 2 and U.S. Route 83 pass through Weslaco, leading west  to McAllen and east  to Harlingen.

Climate

The climate in this area is characterized by two seasons; a wet season from April to September and a dry season from October to March. According to the Köppen Climate Classification system, Weslaco has a humid subtropical climate, abbreviated "Cfa" on climate maps. It is the most easterly city in the central states of the Great Plains with a humid subtropical climate bounded by a semi-arid climate to the west, reflecting in its most shrubby vegetation. The average high in January is 71 °F and the average low is 49 °F. The average high is 97 °F and the average low is 76 °F in August. The warm season is extremely long, as average high temperatures from May through September are above 90 °F (32 °C) and average low temperatures are above 70 °F (21 °C), with relatively high dew point values resulting in higher relative humidity values and heat index values.  Heat index values can consistently reach over 100 °F during these months.

Average annual precipitation is only . Most precipitation occurs in the wet season which occurs from April to September, with the least precipitation distinctly occurring in the dry season from October to March. As September is the peak of the north Atlantic hurricane season and tropical storms and hurricanes occasionally drop copious amounts of rainfall on the region, this month tends to be by far the wettest, averaging  of rain. The driest month is March, with only  of precipitation. Weslaco has had an average annual snowfall of 0.1 inches over the last 30 years.

Temperatures are frequently above 100 °F (38 °C), occasionally as early as February and as late as the end of October, the highest temperature ever recorded in Weslaco is 110 °F (43 °C), once in 1998 and once in 1999. The lowest temperature ever recorded in Weslaco is 13 °F (−11 °C), on January 12, 1962.

Demographics

2020 census

As of the 2020 United States census, there were 40,160 people, 12,671 households, and 9,998 families residing in the city.

2000 census
According to the census of 2000, there were 26,935 people, 8,295 households, and 6,602 families residing in the city. The population density was 2,123.1 people per square mile (819.5/km). There were 10,230 housing units at an average density of 806.4 per square mile (311.3/km). The racial makeup of the city was 14.92% White, 0.27% African American, 0.49% Native American, 1.14% Asian, 0.06% Pacific Islander, 20.93% from other races, and 2.19% from two or more races. Hispanic or Latino of any race were 83.76% of the population.

There were 8,295 households, out of which 41.1% had children under the age of 18 living with them, 59.2% were married couples living together, 17.0% had a female householder with no husband present, and 20.4% were non-families. 18.4% of all households were made up of individuals, and 10.8% had someone living alone who was 65 years of age or older. The average household size was 3.21 and the average family size was 3.68.

In the city, the population was spread out, with 31.8% under the age of 18, 9.9% from 18 to 24, 25.9% from 25 to 44, 17.2% from 45 to 64, and 15.1% who were 65 years of age or older. The median age was 31 years. For every 100 females, there were 87.9 males. For every 100 females age 18 and over, there were 82.4 males.

The median income for a household in the city was $26,573, and the median income for a family was $29,215. Males had a median income of $24,202 versus $19,688 for females. The per capita income for the city was $11,235. About 26.5% of families and 30.9% of the population were below the poverty line, including 40.6% of those under age 18 and 23.5% of those age 65 or over.

Economy

Trade

The focal point of economic activity has shifted from agriculture to international trade, healthcare, retail and tourism since the ratification of the North American Free Trade Agreement in 1994.

In Hidalgo County, cross-border cargo and vehicular traffic have increased 345% and 36.4% respectively since the beginning of the 1990s, from 228,133 to 1,015,554 cargo trucks in 2008 and from 10.92 million to 14.9 million automobiles. US/Mexico trade crossing the international bridge in Hidalgo County increased from $5.0 billion in 1994, pre-NAFTA, to $12.56 billion in 2000 and $19.9 billion in 2006. From 1995 to 2006 the Rio Grande Valley share of NAFTA trade increased 168% from $11.1 billion to $31.6 billion.

Retail sales
It is estimated that there are 40 million visits per year from Mexican citizens coming to Texas for vacations and shopping trips. These people contribute greatly to the retail sales volume that occurs in Weslaco and the surrounding communities.

Healthcare services

Prime Healthcare Services, through its subsidiary Knapp Medical Center, serves Weslaco's emergency medical needs. The facility is outfitted with a Heli-Pad, Level 3 Trauma Unit and 233 hospital beds. Surrounding Knapp Medical is an unofficial healthcare district featuring a concentration of physicians, medical services and pharmacies. This district draws patients from the entire Mid-Valley. There is a double board certified, fellow trained Orthopedic Surgeon specializing in Total Joint Replacement and fracture care. Dr. Michael D. Sander is a native of Weslaco, Texas. Weslaco residents can check with local providers for other specialized needs.

Government 
The current City Officials are Mayor David Suarez, Mayor Pro-Tem Letty Lopez, Commissioner Leo Muñoz (District 1), Commissioner Greg Kerr (District 2), Commissioner JP Rodriguez (District 3), Commissioner Adrian Farias (District 4) and Commissioner Josh Pedraza (District 6). The current Chief of Police is Joel Rivera, a former Division Chief at the Hidalgo County Sheriff's Office.

The United States Postal Service operates the Weslaco Post Office at 109 N Border Ave. 

The Texas Department of Public Safety operates the Region 3 McAllen office in Weslaco.

The United States Border Patrol Weslaco Station is located at 1501 E. Expressway 83.

The Sergeant Tomás Garces Texas Army National Guard Armory located at 1100 Vo Tech Dr, in the home for the C Company 3rd Battalion (Mechanized) 141st Infantry and Detachment 1, Company A, 536th Brigade Support Battalion. This armory was dedicated in honor of Weslaco native Sgt. Tomás Garces, the first Texas Army National Guard combat casualty since World War II.

Transportation

Highways
 Interstate 2 travels through Weslaco.
 U.S. 83 travels through Weslaco as its major east–west artery.

Airports
Private air services are accommodated by the Weslaco Mid Valley Airport. Commercial flights are available at the nearby McAllen Miller International Airport, or the Valley International Airport in Harlingen.

Buses
Local public transportation is provided by Valley Metro.

Education

Primary and secondary schools
Public education in Weslaco is provided by the Weslaco Independent School District, Idea Public Schools, and South Texas Independent School District. There are 4 private schools: San Martin de Porres Catholic School, Valley Grande Adventist Academy, Mid-Valley Christian School, and First Christian Academy. Weslaco also has two Charter schools: Horizon Montessori and Technology Education Charter High School. The city has a Head Start Program, pre-kinder programs as well as several privately owned day care centers.

College and trade schools
Continuing education facilities located within Weslaco include South Texas College, South Texas Vocational Technical Institute, and Valley Grande Institute for Academic Studies. Texas A&M operates an agricultural research center in Weslaco.

Public library

The Mayor Joe V. Sanchez Public Library serves Weslaco. In addition to its book collection, the library offers computer classes and various community events. Meeting rooms and an auditorium are available.

Notable people

 Natalia Anciso, contemporary artist and educator, born in Weslaco
 Harlon Block, United States Marine; lived in Weslaco and graduated from Weslaco High School
 Omar Figueroa Jr., professional boxer, former WBC Lightweight world title holder; lives in Weslaco and graduated from Weslaco East High School
 Roberto García, professional boxer; former WBC Middleweight Silver title holder; lives in Weslaco and graduated from Weslaco High School
 Pat Hingle, actor; lived in Weslaco and graduated from Weslaco High School
 Doug "DJ Wrekk" Huff, record producer, disc jockey born in Weslaco
 Chuck Leah; Americana singer-songwriter, record producer, multi-instrumentalist born in Weslaco
 Gonzalo Lopez, criminal, born in Weslaco
 David Spielberg, actor, born in Weslaco

Museum
The Weslaco Museum has exhibits and hosts events for local residents.

Parks
Weslaco is home to one of the nine sites of the World Birding Center in the Rio Grande Valley. The site is located within the Estero Llano Grande State Park. Visitors can take bird walks, butterfly walks, dragonfly walks, and the electric tram nature tour. The park is also available for school programs and field trips.

The Valley Nature Center is a six-acre park and environmental education center that focuses on the plants and animals of the Rio Grande Valley.

City parks
The City of Weslaco Parks & Recreation Department maintains six city parks, and three public swimming pools. The parks host parades, festivals, holiday programs, special gatherings, and dedications. The department coordinates cultural programs, leisure activities, and events for citizens. Perennial and summer recreation programs are coordinated with residents, athletic organizations, and schools. Weslaco has several baseball and softball leagues as well as little league and soccer.

Tourism
Weslaco is a Winter Texan destination and a gateway between Texas and Mexico. In the summer months, many travelers come to the area to visit the lower Texas coast and the beaches of South Padre Island. Many Mexican vacationers visit the Texas Valley and stay or maintain homes in Weslaco and surrounding communities.

See also 
 
Current estimates show this company has an annual revenue of 30926590 and employs a staff of approximately 630.

References

English:  Home located at 1027 S. Texas Blvd. Weslaco, Texas, coordinates 26°8′54″N 97°59′22″W. Presently it is well preserved and only the facade of a 15-acre nature preserve in the heart of the City of Weslaco in the Rio Grande Valley of South Texas providing a haven for birds, butterflies and other wildlife that thrive among the native habitats of its Tamaulipan Thornscrub forest, orchard butterfly garden, wetlands, and ponds, according to fronteraaudubon.org.

External links

 City of Weslaco official website
 Weslaco Area Chamber of Commerce
 Economic Development Corporation
 "Weslaco, TX" in Handbook of Texas Online

Cities in Hidalgo County, Texas
Cities in Texas
Populated places established in 1919